"Demons of the Punjab" is the sixth episode of the eleventh series of the British science fiction television programme Doctor Who. It was written by Vinay Patel, directed by Jamie Childs, and first broadcast on BBC One on 11 November 2018.

In the episode, Yasmin Khan (Mandip Gill) asks the Doctor (Jodie Whittaker) to take her to see her grandmother (Leena Dhingra) during her youth (Amita Suman), only to cause both them and her friends Graham O'Brien (Bradley Walsh) and Ryan Sinclair (Tosin Cole) to become caught up in the events preceding the partition of India. During this time, the Doctor questions if aliens are involved in the death of a man killed during their visit. The episode was watched by 7.48 million viewers, and was met with positive reviews from critics.

Plot 

While celebrating the birthday of her grandmother Umbreen, Yasmin receives a broken watch from her. Curious over its origins, Yasmin convinces a hesitant Thirteenth Doctor to take her, Graham and Ryan to the Punjab in August 1947 where the watch was broken. Upon arriving, Yasmin learns that the watch's previous owner was a Hindu man named Prem, whom a younger Umbreen intends to marry despite Yasmin's family being Muslim, and Prem definitely not being her grandfather. The Doctor notes that the group have arrived on 17 August, the day before the partition of India. She advises her friends to rush to the wedding ceremony to ensure that they and the family are not caught in the partitioning. But matters become complicated when the group see two aliens, that the Doctor had visions of during brief head pains, over the body of the wedding's overseer sadhu Bhakti.

The group are joined by Prem, who saw the aliens around the time of his older brother's death during his military service in World War II, as the Doctor assumed the aliens killed Bhakti and eventually recognises them as members of the Thijarian, a race of assassins, while finding their ship and stealing a capsule from them. But the Doctor learns that the Thijarians are actually the last of their kind, the capsule holding what remained of their destroyed planet, and have dedicated themselves to commemorate those who die alone. After revealing that Prem will become a casualty of the partition they intend to witness, the Thijarians agree to show the Doctor a recording of Bhakti's death. The footage reveals Bhakti was murdered by Prem's younger brother Manish, who opposes the wedding.

Returning to the others and convinced by Yasmin to see the event through, the Doctor oversees the marriage ceremony with the group witnessing the watch being accidentally broken as Umbreen cherishes its significance. When the Doctor later accosts Manish for Bhakti's murder, he reveals to have contacted a small group of armed Hindu nationalists to attack the wedding reception. As Umbreen and her mother escape with the Doctor's group, Prem remains behind to reason with Manish and dies when the nationalists shoot him while the Thijarians observe. Back in the present, Yasmin's grandmother comments on her granddaughter's new henna.

Production

Casting 
After the premiere episode, "The Woman Who Fell to Earth", was broadcast, it was announced that Shane Zaza, Shobna Gulati, Hamza Jeetooa, and Amita Suman would be among a number of guest actors that would appear in the series. They play Prem, Nadja, Manish and the younger Umbreen respectively.

Music 

Segun Akinola's soundtrack made use of instruments such as the tabla and shehnai, performed by musicians of South Asian descent. Akinola also created a new arrangement of the closing theme after the style of Punjabi music, performed by Kuljit Bahmra, Surjeet Singh, and singer Shahid Abbas Khan.

Filming 
The episode was filmed in the Province of Granada, Spain.

Broadcast and reception

Ratings 
"Demons of the Punjab" was watched by 5.77 million viewers overnight, a share of 27.5% of the total TV audience, making it the third-highest overnight viewership for the night and the eleventh-highest overnight viewership for the week on overnights across all channels. It received an official total of 7.48 million viewers across all UK channels, making it the eighth most watched programme of the week, and had an Audience Appreciation Index score of 80.

Critical reception 
"Demons of the Punjab" received positive reviews. On Rotten Tomatoes, it has an approval rating of 90%, based on 30 reviews, and an average score of 8.0/10. The critical consensus reads, "'Demons of Punjab' focuses on family and progress, solidifying the cohesive thematic stamp this season is making upon the greater series." Writing for New York magazine, Ross Ruediger gave the episode five out of five, calling it "exceptional Doctor Who on pretty much every level," and praising director Jamie Childs and the production team for "delivering something so engaging and adult and educational."

Writing for Digital Spy, Morgan Jeffery praised Segun Akinola's score as "gorgeous" and called the episode "thoughtful" and "gutsy". Jeffery cited some of the episode's shortcomings, however, criticizing the performances from the guest cast. Jeffery also noted a marked shift in Doctor Whos style, and said that fans looking for a "traditional Doctor-vs-monsters tale" may not be satisfied by the episode. Matthew Kresal of Futurism praised Vinay Patel's "compelling" script, complimented Akinola's "evocative" and "haunting" score, and said that "Demons of the Punjab" saw some of the best production values that Doctor Who has had in recent years, calling it one of the show's most "polished" episodes.

In April 2019, "Demons of the Punjab" was announced as a finalist (nominee) in the category of Best Dramatic Presentation, Short Form at the 2019 Hugo Awards.

References

External links 

 
 
 

Fiction set in 1947
2018 British television episodes
Doctor Who stories set on Earth
Television episodes set in India
Television episodes set in Pakistan
Partition of India in fiction
Television episodes about death
Thirteenth Doctor episodes
Television episodes set in the 1940s